Mongolia competed at the 1996 Summer Olympics in Atlanta, United States.

Medalists

Bronze
 Dorjpalamyn Narmandakh — Judo, Men's Extra Lightweight (60 kg)

Results by event

Archery
In the sixth time they competed in archery at the Olympics, Mongolia again entered only one woman.  She lost in the first round of elimination.

Women's Individual Competition:
 Jargal Otgon - round of 64, 44th place (0-1)

Athletics
Men's Discus Throw 
 Dashdendev Makhashiri
 Qualification — 59.16m (→ did not advance)

Women's Marathon
 Erkhemsaikhan Davaajargal — 3:19.06 (→ 63rd place)

Boxing
Men's Bantamweight (– 54 kg)
Davaatseren Jamgan
 First Round — Defeated Oscar Chongo (Zambia), 13-7
 Second Round — Defeated Ki-Woong Bae (South Korea), 11-10 
 Quarter Finals — Lost to Raimkul Malakhbekov (Russia), 9-21

Men's Featherweight (– 57 kg)
Naramchogt Lamgen
 First Round — Lost to Ulugbek Ibragimov (Uzbekistan), referee stopped contest in second round

References

Nations at the 1996 Summer Olympics
1996
1996 in Mongolian sport